In mathematics, the spiral optimization (SPO) algorithm is a metaheuristic inspired by spiral phenomena in nature.

The first SPO algorithm was proposed for two-dimensional unconstrained optimization
based on two-dimensional spiral models. This was extended to n-dimensional problems by generalizing the two-dimensional spiral model to an n-dimensional spiral model.
There are effective settings for the SPO algorithm: the periodic descent direction setting
and the convergence setting.

Metaphor 
The motivation for focusing on spiral phenomena was due to the insight that the dynamics that generate logarithmic spirals share the diversification and intensification behavior. The diversification behavior can work for a global search (exploration) and the intensification behavior enables an intensive search around a current found good solution (exploitation).

Algorithm 

The SPO algorithm is a multipoint search algorithm that has no objective function gradient, which uses multiple spiral models that can be described as deterministic dynamical systems. As search points follow logarithmic 
spiral trajectories towards the common center, defined as the current best point, better solutions can be found and the common center can be updated.

The general SPO algorithm for a minimization problem under the maximum iteration  (termination criterion) is as follows:

 0) Set the number of search points  and the maximum iteration number .
 1) Place the initial search points  and determine the center , ,and then set .
 2) Decide the step rate  by a rule.
 3) Update the search points: 
 4) Update the center:  where .
 5) Set . If  is satisfied then terminate and output . Otherwise, return to Step 2).

Setting 
The search performance depends on setting the composite rotation matrix , the step rate , and the initial points . 
The following settings are new and effective.

Setting 1 (Periodic Descent Direction Setting) 
This setting is an effective setting for high dimensional problems under the maximum iteration . The condition of  works to utilize the periodic descent directions under the search termination .

 Place the initial points   at random to satisfy the following condition:

where . Note that this condition is almost all satisfied by a random placing and thus no check is actually fine.

Setting 2 (Convergence Setting) 
This setting ensures that the SPO algorithm converges to a stationary point under the maximum iteration .
•(Step 1) .
•(Step 4) If  then .

Future works 
 The algorithms with the above settings are deterministic. Thus, incorporating some random operations make this algorithm powerful for global optimization. Cruz-Duarte et al. demonstrated it by including stochastic disturbances in spiral searching trajectories. However, this door remains open to further studies.
 To find an appropriate balance between diversification and intensification spirals depending on the target problem class (including ) is important to enhance the performance.

Extended works 
Many extended studies have been conducted on the SPO due to its simple structure and concept; these studies have helped improve its global search performance and proposed novel applications.

References 

 
Collective intelligence
Multi-agent systems
Evolutionary algorithms
Optimization algorithms and methods